The Canada Education Savings Act (CESA) is an Act of the Parliament of Canada. It is intended to provide financial assistance for post-secondary education savings. The first version of the law was assented to on 15 December 2004. Most sections of the act entered into force on 1 July 2005.

Content 
The law organizes the incentives programs provided by the Government of Canada for post-secondary education savings. As of 2020 these programs include:
 The Canada Education Savings Grant (CESG) a matching contribution made by the government towards contributions made to a Registered Education Savings Plan ;
 The Canada Learning Bond (CLB) an additional grant available to low-income families.

Legislative history 
The Canada Education Savings Act was adopted on third reading on 7 December 2004 by a large majority of 273 votes for (from both Liberal, Conservative and Bloc MPs) versus 19 against (the entire NDP caucus).

Prior to the passage of the Canada Education Savings Act, dispositions administrating the CESG program were contained in the Department of Human Resources Development Act. CESG remained under the purview of Human Resources Development Canada pursuant to an Order in Council.

References

External links
 

Canadian federal legislation
Canadian administrative law
2004 in Canadian law